is a Japanese fashion model, actress, and model. She is represented with Tambourine Artists.

Biography
In 2009, Yamada won the grand prize at the 17th "Pichimo Audition" from the fashion magazine Pichi Lemon (Gakken Publishing), and later in the same year she became a Pichi Lemon exclusive model.

She appeared in the 2010 FIVB Volleyball Men's World Championship's "Sekai Volleyball Ōen Fashion-bu".

In June 2012, Yamada became a member of the idol music group Yumemiru Adolescence.

She graduated from Pichi Lemon from its April 2013 issue.

On 6 January 2017, "because a serious violation of the rules of the group activities was recognized" it was announced that Yamada took self-control over all activities for the time being, she later expressed her apology on her blog two days later.

Later in 31 March, on her blog she announced that she graduated from Yumemiru Adolescence.

Personal life
After graduating from Pichi Lemon, she was browsing and seemed to be mature, but she prefer a cute system appearance, so she long for other members who are short of her.

Yamada said that she inherited the character of her mother and grandmother.

Filmography

Films

Television

Theatre

Anime

Advertisements

Events

Internet

Bibliography

Magazines

Photo albums

Mook

References

External links
 
 
 

Japanese female models
21st-century Japanese actresses
Japanese idols
Models from Osaka Prefecture
1996 births
Living people